Ajay Dutt is an Indian legislator currently member of the Seventh Legislative Assembly of Delhi. He is a member of the Aam Aadmi Party and represents the constituency of Dr. Ambedkar Nagar. Ajay Dutt possesses an MBA degree and is presently pursuing a Phd doctorate in management, since he is enthusiastic about his preferred scholastic domain and aspires to leverage his research expertise to make significant contributions towards that domain. Ajay Dutt was a partner in an information technology services firm before venturing into politics.

Early life and education
Ajay Dutt was born in 1975 in Delhi and has done his schooling from Delhi and continued his education at Delhi University, graduating in 1998. Soon after graduation, he commenced studying for the Union Civil Services examination with the intention of pursuing a career in public service, but owing to family socioeconomic challenges, he was forced to pursue a career in private sector. Ajay Dutt earned a master's degree in business administration from Amity University, Noida, and established himself in the information technology services industry before stepping into politics.

Professional career 

Ajay Dutt has worked for 10 years before he partnered in starting his own IT services firm. As an IT industry expert, he has travelled to several countries and represented India at prominent international summits, with several of his interviews appearing in IT services and technology magazines and other popular Indian dailies including the Times of India and The Economic Times. Ajay Dutt is India's co-chairman of Universal Peace Federation which is dedicated towards Global Peace and possess a consultative status with the Economic and Social Council of the United Nations. He is also the founding member of Inter-Parliamentary Alliance on China (IPAC). Ajay Dutt attended the annual summit of the Inter-Parliamentary Alliance on China in Washington, D.C., which brought together 60 legislators from 30 nations to deliberate issues of global significance. He was also selected to join a team of 19 representatives from nine political parties in India, Sri Lanka, Bangladesh, and Nepal at the Shanghai Party Institute of the CPC's seminar for cadres of political parties in South Asian countries. Ajay Dutt has also volunteered with numerous non-governmental organisations (NGOs) that advocate for global peace and harmony.

Ajay Dutt has been a fervent proponent of the India Against Corruption campaign, which brought millions of Indians together and is widely seen as a watershed event in Indian politics. It was spearheaded by Arvind Kejriwal, a former activist who is now the Delhi Chief Minister. Ajay Dutt later became a member of the Aam Aadmi Party (AAP) in order to bring about systemic reforms in Indian politics, namely electoral transparency, secular ideals, social justice, and pro-people governance. Ajay Dutt was in charge of the IT firm with which he had collaborated when he chose to join Aam Aadmi Party (AAP) in order to bring about revolutionary changes in Indian politics.

Political career

Prior to entering state politics, Ajay Dutt contested and won union elections during his graduate years at Delhi University, where he served as vice-president. Ajay Dutt served as Chairman of the District Development Committee (DDC-South Delhi) and twice as Chairman of the Committee on the Welfare of SC/ST. Ajay Dutt worked on Karnataka's Loksabha election campaign in 2014, served as a star campaigner in Himachal Pradesh, Chhattisgarh, Uttar Pradesh, and Punjab. He was the election co-incharge of Punjab assembly elections which resulted in unprecedented electoral victory. Currently, Ajay Dutt is the Election Co-inchage of Himachal Pradesh.

Ajay Dutt was fielded by the Aam Aadmi Party (AAP) in the 2015 state assembly elections in recognition of his strong participation in the Ambedkar Nagar constituency. Ajay Dutt ousted his predecessor by 42460 votes. Since then, Ajay Dutt has been actively involved in several community development efforts of the Dr. Ambedkar Nagar constituency. Ajay Dutt advocated for the implementation of the old pension scheme for government employees and introduced a bill to the Delhi Vidhan Sabha, which was approved by Delhi Chief Minister Shri Arvind Kejriwal and forwarded to the central government for approval. MLA Ajay Dutt, in response to public uproar, advocated for the scrapping of BRT, a contentious issue which sought to advance faster public transportation by designating a special lane for buses, it underestimated the amount of road space required for other traffic, resulting in gridlock, high pollution from idling vehicles, and frequent accidents on the specially designed stretch from Ambedkar Nagar to Defence Colony. Furthermore, Ajay Dutt facilitated the construction of a 600-bed hospital, 250 new classrooms, a water and sewer line in Khanpur, and the first Metro line in Ambedkar Nagar, which is the most significant work done by any MLA in the history of Dr. Ambedkar Nagar.

MLA Ajay Dutt received the highest score of 4.75 out of 5 in an online poll conducted by www.mlareportcard.com in 2015, making him the most popular MLA in the Delhi Legislative Assembly. Ajay Dutt is widely regarded as one of the most approachable Delhi legislators. Ajay Dutt was named "Mr Popular" in 2016 by Praja Foundation, based on his performance on crucial metrics such as accessibility (among the top 5 MLAs) and public service delivery. Ajay Dutt was rated second among all MLAs believed to be least corrupt in 2018 and also made the Top 5 MLAs list for overall performance. Ajay Dutt has also held significant roles in the Delhi government's numerous committees, the Delhi Legislative Assembly, and the South Delhi district's administrative entities after his election as MLA. Ajay Dutt remains prominent in common parlance as a result of growth and development that transpired during the government's five-year tenure.

In 2019, Ajay Dutt tore his shirt off in the Delhi Assembly in protest over the DDA's destruction of the Ravidas temple (Delhi Development Authority). He claimed unequivocally that if DDA provides the community with four to five acres of land for the Ravidas temple, he would provide the centre with 100 acres of land.

In the 2020 Delhi legislative assembly elections, the Aam Aadmi Party, headed by chief minister Arvind Kejriwal, won 62 seats, securing an absolute majority. Ajay Dutt was re-elected from Dr Ambedkar Nagar Constituency with 62,871 votes (62.84 percent of total votes cast), establishing his credentials as a leader of transformative politics.

Member of Legislative Assembly (2020 - present)
Since 2020, he is an elected member of the 7th Delhi Assembly.

Committee assignments of Delhi Legislative Assembly 
 Member (2022-2023), Committee on Estimates

Posts held 
Delhi Legislative Assembly - House Committees

Electoral performance

See also
Seventh Legislative Assembly of Delhi
Sixth Legislative Assembly of Delhi
Aam Aadmi Party

References

External links
Delhi Legislative Assembly - Composition Of House Committees (2020 - 2021)
Delhi Legislative Assembly - Composition Of House Committees (2016 - 2017)

Delhi MLAs 2015–2020
Delhi MLAs 2020–2025
People from New Delhi
Living people
1976 births
Aam Aadmi Party MLAs from Delhi